The Pal from Texas is a 1939 American Western film directed by Harry S. Webb and written by Carl Krusada. The film stars Bob Steele, Claire Rochelle, Josef Swickard, Betty Mack, Ted Adams and Carleton Young. The film was released on November 1, 1939, by Metropolitan Pictures Corporation.

Plot

Cast           
Bob Steele as Bob Barton
Claire Rochelle as Alice Malden
Josef Swickard as Texas Malden
Betty Mack as Queenie
Ted Adams as Ace Brady
Carleton Young as Joe Fox
Jack Perrin as Sheriff

References

External links
 

1939 films
1930s English-language films
American Western (genre) films
1939 Western (genre) films
Films directed by Harry S. Webb
American black-and-white films
1930s American films